Anne Malmi (born 21 December 1965 as Anne Eerikäinen) is a Finnish female curler and curling coach.

She started curling in 1983 at the age of 18.

Malmi is one of the most successful female curlers in Finland, in various national championships (among women, among mixed teams and mixed doubles) she won a large number of titles and prizes.

Teams

Women's

Mixed

Mixed doubles

Record as a coach of national teams

References

External links
 
 

Living people
1965 births
Finnish female curlers
Finnish curling champions
Finnish curling coaches